Jefferson Township is a township in Jefferson County, in the U.S. state of Arkansas. Its population was 2,416 as of the 2020 census.

References

19th-century establishments in Arkansas
Arkansas populated places on the Arkansas River
Populated places established in the 19th century
Townships in Jefferson County, Arkansas